Protoginella maestratii is a species of sea snail, a marine gastropod mollusk in the family Marginellidae, the margin snails.

Description
The length of the shell attains 8.3 mm.

Distribution
This marine species occurs off New Caledonia.

References

 Boyer F. (2002). Description of five new marginellids from bathyal levels of southern New Caledonia. Novapex 3 (2-3): 87-96 

Marginellidae
Gastropods described in 2002